Daerlac is a genus of dirt-colored seed bugs in the family Rhyparochromidae. There are at least four described species in Daerlac, found mainly in Australia.

Species
These four species belong to the genus Daerlac:
 Daerlac apicalis (Distant, 1904)
 Daerlac cephalotes (Dallas, 1852)
 Daerlac nigricans Distant, 1918
 Daerlac picturatus (Distant, 1904)

References

External links

 

Rhyparochromidae